The Final is a greatest hits album released in 1986 to summarize the career of British pop duo Wham!. The album was not initially released in North America, where an album entitled Music from the Edge of Heaven was released instead. Six songs from that album appear on this compilation. The compilation album was followed by the farewell concert of the same name on 28 June 1986, at Wembley Stadium.

The CD edition omits "Blue (Armed with Love)" and the extended mixes. A deluxe edition of the album was released on CD/DVD and download in November 2011, with the DVD featuring all of Wham!'s music videos, including the video for "Young Guns (Go for It!)", "Last Christmas", and a remix version of the video for "Everything She Wants". It follows the track listing of the CD, with the exception of "Battlestations", as it was a B-side and not an official single.

Background
When George Michael guested on the Aspel & Company talk show on 1 March 1986, he announced that Wham! were to split and perform one last concert, later titled The Final. He also announced that he planned to record the last Wham! single with Andrew Ridgeley the following week in Los Angeles. In fact, as he revealed to journalist Paula Yates on The Tube, he was planning to record four tracks, two of which - "Where Did Your Heart Go" and "The Edge of Heaven" - had been previously played on the Whamamerica! tour, with the other two being new tracks he was experimenting with. This was prior to the filming of the video for Michael's then-forthcoming solo single, "A Different Corner". Michael was planning to release three of the tracks as part of a Wham! EP, but wasn't sure which one of the songs was going to be the main single at that point - all of these would appear on "The Final".

As of 12 March 1986, the album and single had been completed and ready for release under the Wham! name.

Track listing
All songs written by George Michael, except where noted.

Double LP/Cassette
Side one
 "Wham Rap! (Enjoy What You Do)"  (Michael, Andrew Ridgeley) – 6:43
 "Young Guns (Go for It!)"  – 5:09
 "Bad Boys"  – 4:52
 "Club Tropicana" (Michael, Ridgeley) – 4:25

Side two
 "Wake Me Up Before You Go-Go" – 3:51
 "Careless Whisper"  (Michael, Ridgeley) – 6:30
 "Freedom"  – 5:20
 "Last Christmas"  – 6:47

Side three
 "Everything She Wants"  – 6:34
 "I'm Your Man"  – 6:50
 "Blue (Armed with Love)" – 3:50

Side four
 "A Different Corner" – 3:59
 "Battlestations" – 5:27
 "Where Did Your Heart Go?" (David Was, Don Was) – 5:45
 "The Edge of Heaven" – 4:37

CD
 "Wham Rap! (Enjoy What You Do)"  (Michael, Ridgeley) – 6:43 
 "Young Guns (Go for It!)" – 5:09 
 "Bad Boys" – 3:20 
 "Club Tropicana" (Michael, Ridgeley) – 4:25 
 "Wake Me Up Before You Go-Go" – 3:51 
 "Careless Whisper"  (Michael, Ridgeley) – 5:02 
 "Freedom"  – 5:20 
 "Last Christmas"  – 6:47 
 "Everything She Wants"  – 6:30 
 "I'm Your Man" – 4:04 
 "A Different Corner" – 3:59 
 "Battlestations" – 5:27 
 "Where Did Your Heart Go?" (Dave Was & Don Was) – 5:45 
 "The Edge of Heaven" – 4:37

DVD

VHS

Charts

Weekly charts

Year-end charts

Certifications and sales

}

References

Wham! albums
1986 compilation albums
Epic Records compilation albums